C. Vernon Mason is a former lawyer and civil rights advocate from Tucker, Arkansas.  Best known for his involvement in several high-profile New York City cases in the 1980s, including the Bernhard Goetz, Howard Beach, and Tawana Brawley incidents, Mason has not practiced law since his 1995 disbarment. He then served as the CEO of a non-profit organization. He is also an ordained minister.

Education

Mason graduated from Morehouse College and earned a Master's in Business Administration from Indiana University. He then graduated from Columbia Law School earning a Juris Doctor and, later, earned the Master of Divinity, and the Doctor of Ministry degree from New York Theological Seminary.

Notable cases

In 1983 Mason and William Kunstler represented serial killer Lemuel Smith at his trial for the murder of Donna Payant. 

Mason was co-counsel for Darrell Cabey, one of the four men shot by Bernhard Goetz in the famous 1984 "subway vigilante" case.

Mason was one of the lawyers retained by the family of Michael Griffith, manslaughter victim in 
the Howard Beach incident.

In 1987 Mason, along with Alton H. Maddox and Al Sharpton, were advisors to Tawana Brawley, an African-American teenager who claimed to have been abducted and sexually assaulted by at least three white men, including at least one police officer and assistant district attorney Steven Pagones.  However, a grand jury investigation into Brawley's allegations determined that she "had not been abducted, assaulted, raped and sodomized as had been claimed" and that "the 'unsworn public allegations against Dutchess County Assistant District Attorney Steven Pagones' were false and had no basis in fact."  Pagones filed a $385 million lawsuit against Brawley and her advisors for 22 purported defamatory statements; Mason was found liable of making one defamatory statement and ordered to pay $185,000.

Disbarment
Mason was disbarred by the New York State Appellate Division, First Department, in 1995. 
The court cited 66 instances of professional misconduct with 20 clients over the course of 6 years as its rationale for the action, including "repeated neglect of client matters, many of which concerned criminal cases where a client's liberty was at stake; misrepresentations to clients [and] refusal to refund the unearned portion of fees". Though Mason's involvement in the Brawley case was not specifically cited, Mason would allege that the ruling was intended to punish him for the Brawley case.

References

Year of birth missing (living people)
Living people
Disbarred American lawyers
African-American lawyers
African-American Christian clergy
American Christian clergy
Morehouse College alumni
Indiana University alumni
Columbia Law School alumni
New York Theological Seminary alumni
New York (state) lawyers
People from Jefferson County, Arkansas
21st-century African-American people